The women's javelin throw field event at the 1972 Olympic Games took place on August 31 & September 1. On 11 June 1972 Ewa Gryziecka from Poland broke the javelin throw world record with a throw of 62.70m only to have Ruth Fuchs break that record on the same day with a throw of 65.06m.  In 1972 Fuchs was the strong favorite heading in the Olympics.  Kate Schmidt took the early lead on the first throw, but this was soon passed by the favorite on the second throw.  She ended up topping her own mark two more time in rounds four and five.  Fuchs would go one and set the new javelin world record in 1973, 1974 and 1976.

Results
All throwers reaching  and the top 12 including ties, advanced to the finals.  Throwers in blue qualified by reaching the qualifying distance.  Throwers listed in green qualified by being in the top 12.  All distances are listed in metres.

Qualifying

Final

Key:  OR = Olympic record; p = pass; x = fault; NM = no mark

References

External links
Official report

Women's javelin throw
Javelin throw at the Olympics
1972 in women's athletics
Women's events at the 1972 Summer Olympics